Son of a Preacher Man is a studio album by Nancy Wilson, released on Capitol Records in June  1969. It was produced by David Cavanaugh, with arrangements and conducting by Jimmy Jones, Phil Wright, and Joe Parnello. Like other Wilson albums from the same time period, it features a combination of vocal jazz, soul, blues, and popular music, but it also contains songs by country artists Hank Cochran, Roger Miller, and Bobby Russell.

AllMusic calls Son of a Preacher Man a "soulful, sexy collection," with "percolating grooves [that] capture the singer at her hippest." Reviewer Jason Ankeny highlights "Almost Persuaded" and "By the Time I Get to Phoenix," saying the songs "boast an earthy appeal that contrasts sharply with Wilson's signature sophistication, pushing the singer in unexpected but fascinating directions." High Fidelity News hails the "selection of killer blues and soul tracks," including the title song, "delivered with such panache that you wonder why this ever went out of print."

The album entered the Billboard 200 on July 5, 1969, peaking at No. 122. It achieved more success on Billboards Hot R&B LPs, reaching No. 20 and staying on the chart for 23 weeks.

In 2013, SoulMusic Records released a digitally remastered version of the album, paired with Hurt So Bad, another Wilson record from the same time period.

Track listing

Side 1 

 "Son Of A Preacher Man" (John Hurley, Ronnie Wilkins) - 2:53
 "By The Time I Get To Phoenix" (Jimmy Webb) - 3:43
 "Mr. Walker, It's All Over" (Gene Crysler)  - 3:15
 "I Made You This Way" (Bobby Russell) - 4:38
 "Almost Persuaded" (Billy Sherrill, Glenn Sutton) - 2:47

Side 2 

 "Got It Together" (Charles W. Rainey) - 3:09
 "Make The World Go Away" (Hank Cochran) - 2:38
 "Husbands And Wives" (Roger Miller) - 3:10
 "Little Green Apples"(Russell) - 4:30
 "Trouble In Mind" (Richard M. Jones) - 2:24

Personnel 

 Nancy Wilson - vocals
 Jimmy Jones - arranger, conductor
 Phil Wright - arranger, conductor
 Joe Parnello - arranger, conductor
 David Cavanaugh - producer
 Roger Prigent - cover photo

References 

1969 albums
Nancy Wilson (jazz singer) albums
Albums produced by Dave Cavanaugh
Capitol Records albums
Albums arranged by Jimmy Jones (pianist)
Albums conducted by Jimmy Jones (pianist)